The 1903–04 West Virginia Mountaineers men's basketball team represents the University of West Virginia during the 1903–04 college men's basketball season. The team captain was Otis Cole. The Mountaineers finished with an overall record of 4–3.

Schedule

|-

References

West Virginia Mountaineers men's basketball seasons
West Virginia
West Virginia Mountaineers men's b
West Virginia Mountaineers men's b